Sergey Yakshin (born May 9, 1968 in Astana) is a Kazakhstani sport shooter. He competed at the 2000 Summer Olympics in the men's skeet event, in which he finished in 7th place.

References

1968 births
Living people
Sportspeople from Astana
Kazakhstani male sport shooters
Shooters at the 2000 Summer Olympics
Olympic shooters of Kazakhstan
Shooters at the 1998 Asian Games
Shooters at the 2002 Asian Games
Shooters at the 2006 Asian Games
Shooters at the 2010 Asian Games
Skeet shooters
Asian Games medalists in shooting
Asian Games gold medalists for Kazakhstan
Asian Games silver medalists for Kazakhstan
Asian Games bronze medalists for Kazakhstan
Medalists at the 1998 Asian Games
Medalists at the 2002 Asian Games
Medalists at the 2006 Asian Games